Bad Überkingen is a municipality in the district of Göppingen in Baden-Württemberg, Germany.

History
The three towns of Bad Überkingen, Hausen an der Fils, and Unterböhringen were ceded by the Free Imperial City of Ulm to the Electorate of Bavaria in 1802. Bad Überkingen was allowed to append the prefix "Bad" to its name in 1927. The district of Göppingen was reorganized in 1938 as Landkreis Göppingen, its current and contemporary form.

Hausen an der Fils and Unterböhringen were incorporated into Bad Überkingen in 1973.

Geography
The municipality (Gemeinde) of Bad Überkingen is situated in the district of Göppingen, in Baden-Württemberg, one of the 16 States of the Federal Republic of Germany. Elevation above sea level in the municipal area ranges from a high of  Normalnull (NN) on the Michelsberg to a low of  NN on the Fils.

Portions of the Federally-protected , Dalisberg, and  nature reserves are located in Bad Überkingen's municipal area.

Politics
Bad Überkingen has three boroughs (Ortsteile) – Bad Überkingen, Hausen an der Fils, Unterböhringen – and three villages: Michelsberg, Oberböhringen, and Wasserberghaus. The abandoned village of Winegundenwilare is located in the municipal area.

Coat of arms
The coat of arms for Bad Überkingen displays a red fountain with blue waters above a wavy blue surface upon a field of white. This coat of arms was awarded to the municipality with a corresponding municipal flag by the Federal Ministry of the Interior on 18 August 1959.

Transportation
From 1903 to 1983, Bad Überkingen and Hausen an der Fils were served by Tälesbahn railroad.

References

External links

  (in German)

Göppingen (district)
Spa towns in Germany